The Brambilla Family Go on Holiday is a 1941 Italian "white-telephones" comedy film directed by Carl Boese and starring Cesco Baseggio, Massimo Girotti and Elena Luber. A middle-class Milanese family go on holiday.

Cast 
 Cesco Baseggio as Ambrogio Brambilla
 Massimo Girotti as Marco Sassoli
 Elena Luber as Nanà Brambilla
 Amelia Chellini as Adalgisa Brambilla
 Paolo Stoppa as Gastone
 Giulio Stival as the tenor Alfredo Martelli
 Vita Bandini as Donna Fausta, the marchesa
 Umberto Cocchi as the night watchman
 Anita Farra as the art connoisseur
 Luigi Garrone as the manager of the garage
 Renato Malavasi as a friend of Marco
 Lina Tartara Minora as Pina, the maid
 Dina Romano as Maria, the concierge
 Giovanna Scotto as Marco's mother
 Liliana Zanardi as a girl at the bar
 Carmela Rossato
 Jole Ferrari
 Toscano Giuntini

References

Bibliography

External links 
 

1941 films
Italian comedy films
Italian black-and-white films
1941 comedy films
1940s Italian-language films
Films directed by Carl Boese
Films set in Milan
1940s Italian films